Green Valley is a census-designated place (CDP) located in Solano County, California, United States.

The use of "Green Valley" as a place name predates the CDP designation by over a century; a Green Valley Township appears on an 1890 map of Solano County.

The population was 1,654 at the 2020 census.

Geography
Green Valley is located at  (38.259313, -122.164441).

Demographics

2020

The 2020 United States Census reported that Green Valley had a population of 1,654.

2010
The 2010 United States Census reported that Green Valley had a population of 1,625. The racial makeup of the CDP was 1,412 (86.9%) White, 41 (2.5%) African American, 6 (0.4%) Native American, 82 (5.0%) Asian, 9 (0.6%) Pacific Islander, 20 (1.2%) from other races, and 55 (3.4%) from two or more races. Hispanic or Latino of any race were 121 persons (7.4%).

The Census reported that 100% of the population lived in households.

There were 678 households, out of which 130 (19.2%) had children under the age of 18 living in them, 484 (71.4%) were opposite-sex married couples living together, 37 (5.5%) had a female householder with no husband present, 19 (2.8%) had a male householder with no wife present.  There were 17 (2.5%) unmarried opposite-sex partnerships, and 6 (0.9%) same-sex married couples or partnerships. 108 households (15.9%) were made up of individuals, and 61 (9.0%) had someone living alone who was 65 years of age or older. The average household size was 2.40.  There were 540 families (79.6% of all households); the average family size was 2.65.

The population was spread out, with 215 people (13.2%) under the age of 18, 96 people (5.9%) aged 18 to 24, 210 people (12.9%) aged 25 to 44, 633 people (39.0%) aged 45 to 64, and 471 people (29.0%) who were 65 years of age or older.  The median age was 55.5 years. For every 100 females, there were 102.4 males.  For every 100 females age 18 and over, there were 98.3 males.

The homeowner vacancy rate was 2.2%; the rental vacancy rate was 9.4%. 91.7% of the population lived in owner-occupied housing units and 8.3% lived in rental housing units.

2000
As of the census of 2000, there were 1,859 people, 735 households, and 609 families residing in the CDP. The racial makeup of the CDP was 85.15% White, 6.72% African American, 0.48% Native American, 3.01% Asian, 0.16% Pacific Islander, 0.54% from other races, and 3.93% from two or more races. Hispanic or Latino of any race were 4.46% of the population.

There were 735 households, out of which 25.9% had children under the age of 18 living with them, 72.0% were married couples living together, 8.8% had a female householder with no husband present, and 17.1% were non-families. 12.4% of all households were made up of individuals, and 6.8% had someone living alone who was 65 years of age or older.  The average household size was 2.53 and the average family size was 2.74.

In the CDP, the population was spread out, with 21.2% under the age of 18, 5.4% from 18 to 24, 16.4% from 25 to 44, 36.6% from 45 to 64, and 20.4% who were 65 years of age or older.  The median age was 50 years. For every 100 females, there were 91.8 males.  For every 100 females age 18 and over, there were 89.0 males.

The median income for a household in the CDP was $83,755, and the median income for a family was $82,549. Males had a median income of $81,067 versus $32,917 for females. The per capita income for the CDP was $42,979.  About 8.5% of families and 9.7% of the population were below the poverty line, including 24.2% of those under age 18 and none of those age 65 or over.

References

Census-designated places in Solano County, California
Census-designated places in California